Boiling Point is a 1993 American action film starring Wesley Snipes and directed by James B. Harris, who was also the film's writer. The film co-stars Dennis Hopper, Lolita Davidovich, and Viggo Mortensen.

The film was released in the United States on April 16, 1993. It was James B. Harris' last film. It is based on the novel Money Men by former U.S. Secret Service agent Gerald Petievich, who co-wrote the screenplay.

Plot

This film opens with Treasury Agent Jimmy Mercer (Wesley Snipes) and his partner Brady (Dan Hedaya) doing some undercover work, when Mercer's fellow Agent is shot and killed by a new man, Ronnie (Viggo Mortensen) that criminal Rudolph "Red" Diamond (Dennis Hopper) pulled out of jail. Now on a snap of anger and thoughts of revenge, Mercer wants to find the killer and take him down before he gets transferred to Newark. Although a cop and close colleague claims over dinner that Mercer must do it "by the book," Mercer replies that "when I'm done with this motherfucker, I'm gonna put him in a box..... by the book."

A background theme is the closing of a big band dance emporium called the Palace.  Lonely, Red takes hooker Vicky (Lolita Davidovich) there for dancing.  Lolita is also involved romantically with Mercer, who is estranged from his ex-wife.

Red continues to try to build a relationship with his old girlfriend, waitress Mona,  (Valerie Perrine).  Typically, he has manipulated and betrayed her in the past.

Red is under increasing pressure to repay mob debts to boss Tony Dio (Tony Lo Bianco).  He manipulates Ronnie into a crime spree culminating in the murder of the boss and ransacking his apartment. He tells Ronnie to meet him  at the palace at 9 PM to split up the money. He asks Mona to meet him there as well.  Mercer is building his case against Red and arrives at the murder scene seconds too late.  Red is soon arrested and a net is laid for Ronnie at the club

At the club Red again manipulates Ronnie in an attempt to escape, yelling gun as he ducks.  Ronnie is shot by Mercer in the exchange and Red almost escapes.  As Red is taken away in the police car Mona arrives, seeing him pass by.  In the last scene Jimmy asks Vicky  to leave with him.

The epilogue reports that they actually did move to Newark.

Cast

 Wesley Snipes as US Treasury Agent Jimmy Mercer
 Dennis Hopper as Rudolph "Red" Diamond
 Lolita Davidovich as Vikki Dunbar
 Viggo Mortensen as Ronnie
 Dan Hedaya as US Treasury Agent Sam Brady
 Seymour Cassel as Virgil Leach
 Jonathan Banks as Max Waxman
 Christine Elise as Carol
 Tony Lo Bianco as Tony Dio
 Valerie Perrine as Mona
 James Tolkan as Senior US Treasury Agent Jerry Levitt
 Paul Gleason as Michael, The Transaction Man
 Lorraine Evanoff as Connie
 Stephanie E. Williams as Sally Mercer
 Tobin Bell as Freddie Roth
 Bobby Hosea as Steve
 Al Guarino as US Treasury Agent Sal Russo
 George Gerdes as Henderson 
 James Pickens Jr. as Prison Guard
 Jophery Brown as Edmund, The Bar Backup Man
 Rick Dean as The Bartender

Reception

Critical response
The film earned negative reviews from critics. It currently holds a 17% on Rotten Tomatoes based on 12 reviews. Audiences polled by CinemaScore gave the film an average grade of "C−" on an A+ to F scale.

References

External links
 
 
 

1993 films
1993 action thriller films
1990s police procedural films
American films about revenge
American action thriller films
American police detective films
Films directed by James B. Harris
Films set in Los Angeles
Films shot in California
Warner Bros. films
1990s English-language films
1990s American films